Leslie Fletchard "Bill" Fleming (July 31, 1913 – June 4, 2006) was an American professional baseball pitcher. His professional career lasted for 16 seasons between 1936 and 1953, missing the 1945 campaign because of service in the United States Army during World War II.

Fleming won 128 games in minor league baseball and appeared in all or parts of six Major League seasons for the Boston Red Sox (1940–41) and Chicago Cubs (1942–44, 1946). In his MLB career, Fleming posted a 16–21 win–loss record with a 3.79 earned run average and 167 strikeouts in 123 games pitched (40 as a starter).

Fleming died in Reno, Nevada on June 4, 2006, at the age of 92.

References

External links

Baseball Library

1913 births
2006 deaths
Baseball players from California
Bellingham Chinooks players
Boston Red Sox players
Chicago Cubs players
Hollywood Stars players
Los Angeles Angels (minor league) players
Louisville Colonels (minor league) players
Major League Baseball pitchers
Milwaukee Brewers (minor league) players
Mission Reds players
Muskogee Tigers players
Portland Beavers players
Saint Mary's Gaels baseball players
San Bernardino Pride players
Vancouver Maple Leafs players